The men's 800 metres event at the 1984 Summer Olympics in Los Angeles, California took place between 3 and 6 August. Sixty-nine athletes from 55 nations competed. The maximum number of athletes per nation had been set at 3 since the 1930 Olympic Congress. The event was won by Joaquim Cruz of Brazil, the nation's first medal in the men's 800 metres. Sebastian Coe of Great Britain repeated his silver-medal performance from 1980, the eighth man to win two medals in the event.

Summary

With four notable front runners in the race the battle to the break was important.  Edwin Koech on the far outside and Joaquim Cruz went out hard around the first turn, with Earl Jones and Johnny Gray to the inside.  Cruz, Jones and Gray converged at the same spot, Gray getting the short end of the stick and suddenly losing ground to the back of the field, then Koech converged from the outside, closing the door on Cruz and Jones, with Cruz edging ahead of Jones as contact was made causing Cruz to jump 200 metres into the race.  The lead group was marked by British rivals, defending champion Steve Ovett and world record holder Sebastian Coe.  They held that order through the next 200 metres, only upset by Gray long striding along the outside up to Coe's shoulder.  Gray's added speed seemed to force the leaders to run faster to stay ahead of him, while Ovett withered out the back of the field.  With 200 to go Gray seemed to tighten up, frustrated that his hard effort only netted him fifth place.  Through the turn, Cruz inched closer to Koech, still marked by Coe and Jones.  When Cruz pounced coming off the turn, Koech wilted, outside of him Coe and Jones were in a shoulder to shoulder sprint battle.  Cruz had won the war, sprinting away to a clear 5 metre victory.  Coe was able to make a slight gain on Jones to take silver.  Jones still held off a late charge by Billy Konchellah for bronze.

Background

This was the 20th appearance of the event, which is one of 12 athletics events to have been held at every Summer Olympics. Three of the top four men from 1980 returned: gold medalist Steve Ovett and silver medalist Sebastian Coe of Great Britain, as well as fourth-place finisher Agberto Guimarães of Brazil. Coe (the world record holder) was a favorite, along with Guimarães's countryman Joaquim Cruz. Ovett had a respiratory illness and, while still strong in the event, was not at peak power.

Of the 55 nations represented, 20 had never had a competitor in the men's 800 metres before: Antigua and Barbuda, the British Virgin Islands, Ecuador, Equatorial Guinea, the Gambia, Grenada, Jordan, Mozambique, Nepal, Niger, Oman, Paraguay, Rwanda, San Marino, the Seychelles, the Solomon Islands, Swaziland, the United Arab Emirates, North Yemen, and Zimbabwe all appeared in the event for the first time. Great Britain made its 19th appearance, most among all nations, having had no competitors in the event only in the 1904 Games in St. Louis.

Competition format

For only the second time, the 800 metres was run over four rounds (the first was in 1960); the number of runners had increased to 69 from 41 in 1980. The "fastest loser" system introduced in 1964 was used for the first round. There were nine first-round heats, each with 7 or 8 athletes; the top three runners in each heat as well as the next five fastest overall advanced to the semifinals. There were four quarterfinals, each of 8 athletes; the top four runners in each advanced to the semifinals. There were two semifinals with 8 athletes each; the top four runners in each semifinal advanced to the eight-man final.

Records

Prior to the competition, the existing World and Olympic records were as follows.

In the final Joaquim Cruz set a new Olympic record at 1:43.00.

Schedule

All times are Pacific Daylight Time (UTC-7)

Results

Round 1

Quarterfinals

Quarterfinal 1

Quarterfinal 2

Quarterfinal 3

Quarterfinal 4

Semifinals

Semifinal 1

Semifinal 2

Final

See also
 1982 Men's European Championships 800 metres (Athens)
 1983 Men's World Championships 800 metres (Helsinki)
 1984 Men's Friendship Games 800 metres (Moscow)
 1986 Men's European Championships 800 metres (Stuttgart)

References

External links
 Results
 Results

 
800 metres at the Olympics
Men's events at the 1984 Summer Olympics